Mehrabad (also Romanized as Mehrābād; also known as Mihrābād) is a village in Kachu Rural District, in the Central District of Ardestan County, Isfahan Province, Iran. At the 2006 census, its population was 19, in 7 families.

References 

Populated places in Ardestan County